The Evansville Braves was the primary nickname of a minor league baseball team based in Evansville, Indiana 1938–1942 and 1946–1957, playing in the Illinois-Indiana-Iowa League. Baseball Hall of Fame Inductees Bob Uecker and Warren Spahn played for Evansville during this era.

History
The Evansville Bees and Braves played the Class B Illinois–Indiana–Iowa League (the "Three-I" League) from 1938–1957, interrupted when the league ceased play during World War II. They played home games at Bosse Field, which is currently the third oldest baseball stadium in regular use in the United States.

Evansville of the Three-I League had a single affiliation with the Major League Braves franchise, playing as  affiliates of the Boston Bees (1938–1940), Boston Braves (1941–1942 and 1946–1952) and the Milwaukee Braves (1953–1957). The Evansville Bees (1938–1940) took their name when the Boston Braves changed their nickname to the Bees for a few seasons.

The team ceased after the 1957 season and Evansville was without baseball until the Evansville White Sox began play in the Class AA Southern League in 1966. Today, Evansville and Bosse Field are home to the  Frontier League's Evansville Otters.

The ballpark
The franchise played at Bosse Field. Bosse Field was built in 1915 and had a capacity of 7,200 during the Braves era. Historic Bosse Field is still in use today, serving as the home park for the Evansville Otters of the Frontier League. Next to Fenway Park (1912) and Wrigley Field (1914), Memorial Stadium in the third oldest professional park in existence, opening on June 17, 1915. Bosse Field is located at 1701 Main Street & Morgan Street, Evansville, Indiana.

Championships
 The franchise won four Illinois–Indiana–Iowa League Championships: 1946, 1948, 1956 and 1957.

Major League Affiliations
 1938–1942; 1946–1952, Boston Braves/Bees
 1953–1957, Milwaukee Braves

Notable alumni

Baseball Hall of Fame alumni
Warren Spahn (1941) Inducted, 1973
 Bob Uecker (1957) Ford C. Frick Award, 2003

Notable alumni
 Claud Raymond (1957) MLB All-Star
 Lee Maye (1955-1956)
 Jim Frey (1951-1952) 
 Del Crandall (1949) MLB All-Star
 Dick Donovan (1948) MLB All-Star
 Chuck Tanner (1946) Manager: 1979 World Series Champion - Pittsburgh Pirates

Year-by-year record

References

Defunct minor league baseball teams
Sports in Evansville, Indiana
Defunct baseball teams in Indiana
1938 establishments in Indiana
1957 disestablishments in Indiana
Boston Braves minor league affiliates
Boston Bees minor league affiliates
Milwaukee Braves minor league affiliates
Illinois-Indiana-Iowa League teams
Baseball teams established in 1938
Baseball teams disestablished in 1957